Shanti Sethi is an American naval officer and the only Indian-American woman and the 15th female officer to command a major US Navy combat warship. She commanded the guided missile destroyer  from 15 December 2010 to May 2012. From 2021-2022, she served as the Navy's Senior Military Advisor to the Secretary of the Navy. From February 2022 until the Fall of 2022, she was detailed o the Office of the Vice President as Executive Secretary and Defense Advisor. She is now detailed to the National Security Council as Director for Talent Management and Recruiting.

Background
Captain Shanti Sethi is a native of Reno, Nevada. She graduated from Norwich University in 1993 with a degree in International Affairs. She also holds a Masters of International Policy and Practice from The George Washington University's Elliott School of International Affairs.

Career
After postings in various ships and naval shore installations, Sethi assumed command of USS Decatur on 15 December 2010.

She is the first female commander of an American naval ship to visit India.

In 2015, she was promoted to the rank of Captain.

Sethi's decorations and awards include the Meritorious Service Medal (two awards), Navy Commendation Medal (four awards), the Navy Achievement Medal, and unit and campaign awards.

In February 2022 Sethi was appointed as the defence advisor to the Vice President of the US, Kamala Harris. She is currently serving  as the National Security Council's Director for Talent Management and Recruiting.

References

External links 
 

Living people
United States Navy captains
Female United States Navy officers
Norwich University alumni
Elliott School of International Affairs alumni
American people of Indian descent
Year of birth missing (living people)